The GSIS Building is the headquarters of the Government Service Insurance System (GSIS), the corporation that handles social security of the employees of the government of the Philippines. Located in Pasay, it is also the seat of the Senate.

Old building 
The original headquarters of the GSIS was on Arroceros Street, Manila. Built in 1957, it was designed by Federico Ilustre. Gerald Lico said that it "adhered to a stylistic tendency that stood at the intersection between Neoclassical and modern aesthetics" in his book Arkitekturang Filipino. In 2017, it was reported it much of the structure will be demolished, save for the facade. The Manila Hall of Justice will be built in its place. Two years earlier, it was proposed to be used as a homeless shelter.

New building 
The new headquarters in Pasay was designed by Jorge Ramos. The Senate transferred to the GSIS Building in 1997, after sitting at the Old Congress Building in Manila. President Joseph Estrada, comparing the Old Congress Building and the GSIS building, said that the latter looks like a bank, while the former had character and ambiance.

Usage by the GSIS 
The GSIS houses a museum, the GSIS Museo ng Sining, in the building. Its theater hosted the funeral of former Senate President Jovito Salonga in 2016.

Usage by the Senate 
The Senate, which meets in a separate place from the House of Representatives which is in the Batasang Pambansa Complex, rents usage of the building from the GSIS. In 2009, Senator Miriam Defensor Santiago urged the Senate to build its own building, as they are paying 7.8 million pesos for the building and 500,000 pesos for the parking lot, every month. This totaled to almost 100 million pesos in a year.

By 2017, Senator Panfilo Lacson, who is also the chairman of the Committee on Accounts, said that the Senate has paid 2.24 billion pesos to the GSIS since 1996. Arguing that the Senate could've paid for a new building with this amount, there had been moves to find a new building for the Senate. The Manila Film Center was suggested, but due to urban legends of it being haunted by the ghosts of the construction workers who died building it, the Senate decided to look for other options. Lacson spearheaded a successful vote approving the transfer of the Senate to a new building in Taguig.

The Senate has its museum in the building.

Other usage 
The Philippine Olympic Committee announced that it will hold a special election for its officers in 2019 after meeting at the building.

References 

Government buildings in the Philippines
Buildings and structures in Pasay
Legislative buildings
Seats of national legislatures
Senate of the Philippines